PS Brocklesby was a passenger and cargo vessel built for the Great Central Railway in 1912.

History

The ship was built by Earle's Shipbuilding of Hull and launched on 22 February 1912 by Mrs J.A. Roger of Grimsby. She was one of an order for two vessels, the other being . She was used on the New Holland to Hull ferry service.

In 1923 she transferred to the London and North Eastern Railway. She was sold in 1935 to the Redcliffe Shipping Company and renamed Highland Queen.  She was used on Firth of Forth pleasure cruises, but found unsuitable and scrapped in 1936.

References

1912 ships
Steamships of the United Kingdom
Paddle steamers of the United Kingdom
Ships built on the Humber
Ships of the London and North Eastern Railway
Ships of the Great Central Railway